In economics, alternative employment arrangements are categorized  in four types of alternative employment arrangements: independent contractors, on-call workers, temporary help agency workers, and workers provided by contract firms.

See also
 Bureau of Labor Statistics
 Employment

References

External links
 Alternative employment arrangements, U.S. Bureau of Labor Statistics Division of Information Services
 Contingent and Alternative Employment Arrangements, U.S. Bureau of Labor Statistics Division of Information Services

Employment classifications
Labour economics